In Uzbek football, Uzbekistan Super League Topscorer is an annual award by Uzbekistan Football Association given to the top goalscorer at the end of the Uzbekistan Super League season, the top domestic league competition in club football in Uzbekistan, since its creation in 1992.

Jafar Irismetov is the only player who won award 3 times and the goalscorer scored most per season with 45 goals in 2000. Brazilian forward Rivaldo became the first foreign player won Uzbekistan Super League Top Scorer award in 2009, scoring 20 goals.
Serbian striker Dragan Ćeran is the only foreign player who became The top goalscorer twice: 2019, 2020.

List of topscorers

By player

By club

See also
Gennadi Krasnitsky club
Club 200 of Berador Abduraimov
Uzbekistan Footballer of the Year
Uzbekistan Football Coach of the Year

References

External links
 Uzbekistan - List of Topscorers

Uzbekistan
Awards established in 1992
1992 establishments in Uzbekistan
Uzbekistani football trophies and awards
Top Scorer
Top
Association football player non-biographical articles